JinXing Digital CO.Ltd or Jianghang Digital (commonly referred to as JXD) is a Chinese manufacturer of consumer electronics based in Shenzhen, Guangdong.

History
Established in 1995, Jinxing Digital Co. Ltd is a manufacturer that specializes in the production of MP3 players and other consumer electronic products.

In 2005, the company started manufacturing flash MP4 players, HD MP4 and PMPs.

JXD's first product to garner interest from retro gamers was the JXD 301, which had a Blackfin 533 MHz processor and could emulate a wide variety of retro video game consoles in a handheld format.

Android products
JXD produce a range of Android tablets which use a gaming console formfactor.

JXD started manufacturing tablets & gaming handhelds running on the Android OS in 2011. They are one of the first manufacturers to release an Android 4.0 firmware (Ice Cream Sandwich) for their tablets.

2012
JXD S7100
JXD S601
JXD V5200
JXD S5110
JXD S5100
JXD S603
JXD S602
JXD V5200
JXD 300 b
JXD S9100

2013
JXD S5300
JXD S7300
JXD S5110b
JXD S502b
JXD S602b
JXD S7800A
JXD S5800

2014
JXD T9006
JXD P3000G
JXD T9002
JXD T9000
JXD T8009
JXD T9003
JXD T7000
JXD T7001
JXD T8000L
JXD P300G
JXD P3000L
JXD P2000L
JXD P200G
JXD P300R
JXD P3000F
JXD P3000S
JXD P861
JXD P863
JXD S7800B

2016
JXD S192

Cancelled
JXD P2000L

References

External links
 Official site 

Electronics companies of China
Manufacturing companies based in Shenzhen
1995 establishments in China
Companies established in 1995
Chinese brands